The Pennsylvania Railroad Station in Fort Wayne, Indiana, also known as Baker Street Station, is a former passenger rail station in downtown Fort Wayne, Indiana. The American Craftsman-style station opened to the public March 23, 1914, at a cost of $550,000.

History 
The station saw its most heavy usage during World War II, when about 3,000 visitors passed through the station daily. The station was also frequented by politicians on whistle stop train tours, including U.S. Presidents Harding, Coolidge, Hoover, Franklin D. Roosevelt, Truman, and Eisenhower. Until 1957 a Grand Rapids originating branch of the Pennsylvania Railroad's Chicago-Florida Southland made a stop in at the station, and picked up passengers from a connecting Wabash Railroad train from Detroit, Michigan. Until 1961 the PRR's Cincinnati, Ohio-Mackinaw City, Michigan Northern Arrow also made a stop there, and picked up connecting passenger rail cars from Chicago. Until 1971 the Penn Central ran the Broadway Limited and several other Chicago-New York City passenger trains, Admiral, Manhattan Limited and Pennsylvania Limited through the station.

The nearest active passenger train station is Waterloo (for the Capitol Limited), 32 miles to the north.

Today, Baker Street Station's concourse is used as a banquet hall and community events space, while the east and west wings have been converted into office space. Over the last decade, residents and local leaders have begun a movement to bring passenger rail service back to the city and station in the form of Amtrak or other high-speed rail service.

Although the station has been without passenger rail service for over 30 years, it has remained a landmark to the city, designated a Fort Wayne Local Historic District in 1990. and later, was added to the National Register of Historic Places in 1998 as the Pennsylvania Railroad Station.

References

External links 

Baker Street Station

National Register of Historic Places in Fort Wayne, Indiana
Buildings and structures in Fort Wayne, Indiana
Transportation in Fort Wayne, Indiana
Former Pennsylvania Railroad stations
Former Amtrak stations in Indiana
Railway stations on the National Register of Historic Places in Indiana
Railway stations in the United States opened in 1914
American Craftsman architecture in Indiana
Arts and Crafts architecture in the United States
Railway stations closed in 1990
Transportation buildings and structures in Allen County, Indiana
1914 establishments in Indiana
Former Wabash Railroad stations